Eugène Vallin (1856 – 21 July 1922) was a French furniture designer and manufacturer, as well as an architect.

Life and career 
Vallin was born at Herbéviller, and studied at the École des Beaux-Arts in Nancy. He was apprenticed in the studio of his uncle, also a furniture maker, beginning in 1881.

His first projects were for church interiors and furniture but quickly he became a disciple of Art Nouveau, in part under the influence of Émile Gallé, for whom he created the door of Gallé's new studios. But he was most famous for his furniture, designing entire living rooms and dining room ensembles for notable personalities in Nancy, including Jean-Baptiste "Eugène" Corbin, Charles Masson, Albert Bergeret, and others.

In 1895-6, he built a new studio and his own house on the Boulevard Lobau in Nancy, which became what is now considered (in a crude form) the first Art Nouveau edifice in the city with the help of his friend, architect Georges Biet. In return, Vallin was responsible for the furniture that adorned Biet's house at 22, rue de la Commanderie, in Nancy.

In 1901, along with Antonin Daum and Louis Majorelle, Vallin became one of three vice-presidents of the board of directors of the École de Nancy.

In architecture, he was one of the pioneers of construction in concrete reinforced by steel, a technique he used for the construction of the pavilion of the École de Nancy at the International Exposition of the East of France in 1909.  He died in Nancy.

External links

Musée de l'Ecole de Nancy

1856 births
1922 deaths
People from Meurthe-et-Moselle
19th-century French architects
20th-century French architects
French furniture designers
French furniture makers
French decorative artists
Art Nouveau designers
Art Nouveau architects
Members of the École de Nancy